Stephane may refer to:
 Stéphane, a French given name
 Stephane (Ancient Greece), a vestment in ancient Greece
 Stephane (Paphlagonia), a town of ancient Paphlagonia, now in Turkey